Good-Bye, Bill is a lost 1918 American comedy silent film directed by John Emerson and written by John Emerson and Anita Loos. The film stars Shirley Mason, Ernest Truex, Joseph Allen Sr., Joseph Burke, Carl De Planta, and Henry S. Koser. The film was released on December 15, 1918, by Paramount Pictures.

Plot

Cast
Shirley Mason as Elsie Dresser
Ernest Truex as Teddy Swift
Joseph Allen Sr. as Kaiser William the Nut
Joseph Burke as Herr Dresser
Carl De Planta as Prince Willie
Henry S. Koser as Herr Tonik 
J. Herbert Frank as Count Von Born Effry-Minutt

References

External links 
 
 

1918 films
1910s English-language films
Silent American comedy films
1918 comedy films
Paramount Pictures films
Films directed by John Emerson
Lost American films
American black-and-white films
American silent feature films
1918 lost films
Lost comedy films
1910s American films